The Falkland Islands general election of 1985 was held on Thursday 3 October 1985 to elect members to the Legislative Council. Eight Councillors were elected through universal suffrage using block voting, four from each constituency (Camp and Stanley).

It was the first election since Falkland Islands Constitution Order 1985 came into force which increased the number of elected Councillors to eight (four from each constituency) and abolished four constituencies (East Falkland, East Stanley, West Falkland and West Stanley).

Results
Candidates in bold were elected.  Candidates in italic were incumbents.

Camp constituency

Stanley constituency

Notes

References

1985 elections in South America
General election
1985
Non-partisan elections
1985 elections in British Overseas Territories
October 1985 events in South America